The Union of Socialist Democrats of Togo (Union des Démocrates Socialistes du Togo) is a political party in Togo. The party participated in the October 2007 parliamentary election, but did not win any seats.

References

Political parties in Togo
Socialist parties in Africa